Gleichenia cryptocarpa known locally as yerba loza, cola de gallo and ampe, is a fern with a natural distribution in Chile ranging from Maule Region (~35° S) in the north to Aysén Region (~47° S) in the south including adjacent areas of Argentina. It grows also naturally in the Falkland Islands. It is found in altitude ranging from 20 to 2240 m.a.s.l.

References

 Florachilena.cl

cryptocarpa
Ferns of Argentina
Ferns of Chile
Flora of the Falkland Islands